Henry Gordon "Hank" Blade (April 28, 1920 – February 8, 2003) was a Canadian professional ice hockey centre who played twenty-four games in the National Hockey League with the Chicago Black Hawks. He spent the majority of his career with the Kansas City Pla-Mors of the United States Hockey League. Blade was born in Peterborough, Ontario.

External links

1920 births
2003 deaths
Canadian ice hockey centres
Chicago Blackhawks players
Ice hockey people from Ontario
Sportspeople from Peterborough, Ontario